The Gooseneck Lake IV Site, also designated 20DE44 , is an archaeological site located in Delta County, Michigan. The site dates from the Woodland period. It was listed on the National Register of Historic Places in 2014.

References

Further reading

Geography of Delta County, Michigan
Archaeological sites on the National Register of Historic Places in Michigan
National Register of Historic Places in Delta County, Michigan